Erin Victoria Holland (born 21 March 1989) is an Australian singer, television host, sports presenter, model, dancer, and charity worker. She won her national title, Miss World Australia, on 20 July 2013.

She has also featured as a sports presenter at the Pakistan Super League in seasons 4, 5, 7and 8,covering the matches on ground as well as post-match ceremonies. She is married to Australian cricketer Ben Cutting,

Early life
Erin was born in Cairns, Far North Queensland to parents Trish and Mark Holland. Her love of music began from 3 years of age, when her father taught her how to play the recorder. Since this early introduction, she trained as a classical, musical theatre and jazz singer, played the clarinet and saxophone and studied musical theory, with the dream of one day starring as a leading lady on Broadway.

Erin trained in jazz and tap dancing from the age of 4, receiving honours in Advanced R.A.D Examinations. Throughout her schooling, she performed in orchestras, big bands, choirs, wind ensembles and many musicals.

Her amateur theatre credits included lead roles in Anything Goes (Reno Sweeney), Beauty and the Beast (Belle), Annie (Lily) and Fame (Carmen). Upon graduating from Cairns State High School in 2006, Erin moved to Sydney to pursue her dreams, to study on scholarship at the Sydney Conservatorium of Music.

Education

Holland is a classically trained soprano singer holding a Bachelor of Classical Voice degree from the Sydney Conservatorium of Music. She received a scholarship after graduating from Cairns State High School in 2006. Erin also received a Music Scholarship from The Women's College, University of Sydney, where she lived throughout the 4 years of her bachelor's degree.

She has achieved advanced qualifications in Classical Voice, Clarinet and Theory A.M.E.B examinations, as well as Jazz and Tap dance examinations.

Modeling career

Miss World Australia 2013 
Holland beat 32 finalists to be crowned Miss World Australia on 20 July 2013. For the talent component of the competition, Holland sang "Maybe This Time" from the 1972 musical film Cabaret, receiving first place, and Miss World Australia Talent. She went on to represent Australia in the Miss World International competition in Bali, Indonesia. She credits her success to her wonderful family and friends, and the Miss World Australia organisation.

Miss World 2013 
Holland was awarded the Miss World Continental Queen of Beauty, Oceania on 28 September 2013, placing in the Top 10 of the overall competition out of 130 countries. For the talent component of the competition, she performed "Someone Like You" from the 1990 musical Jekyll & Hyde, where she received first Runner-up, Erin also placed first Runner-up in the coveted Beauty With A Purpose philanthropy component and eighth in Interview.

As the reigning Miss World Oceania, Erin has travelled with the Miss World organisation since the competition, performing and attending events in China and United States; most recently performing and judging the International Mister World 2014 competition in England.

Charity work
Erin is an ambassador for the International Beauty with a Purpose Charity as a former Beauty Queen. This has seen her actively involved in providing aid for the Lilla Community, a remote Indigenous community located in the Northern Territory, Australia. Erin is also involved with Variety, the Children's Charity, Make-A-Wish Foundation and is an ambassador for McHappy Day, supporting the Ronald McDonald Charity.

References

External links

 Official website
 

Living people
1989 births
Australian beauty pageant winners
People from Cairns
Miss World 2013 delegates
Sydney Conservatorium of Music alumni